George Paul Lombard (born September 14, 1975) is an American professional baseball coach and former outfielder who is the bench coach for the Detroit Tigers of Major League Baseball (MLB).

Lombard, a Parade All America and USA Today All America high school running back, had initially committed to play football for the Georgia Bulldogs before changing his plans in favor of playing baseball. Lombard earned his bachelor's degree in psychology from the University of Phoenix in 2015.

Baseball career
Lombard played baseball and football at The Lovett School in Atlanta. He initially committed to play college football for the Georgia Bulldogs. Lombard was drafted in the second round by the Atlanta Braves in the 1994 Major League Baseball Draft. He signed for $425,000. He played for the Braves, Detroit Tigers, Tampa Bay Devil Rays, and Washington Nationals. In 2002, in 241 at bats he batted .241/.300/.373 for Detroit with 5 home runs and 13 stolen bases. In his major league career, in 350 at bats he batted .220 with 8 home runs and stole 23 bases in 25 attempts.

He was the first American baseball player to hit a home run in China during the MLB China Series on March 15, 2008. During the 2008-2009 offseason, Lombard signed a minor league contract with the Cleveland Indians.

On July 4, 2009, Lombard was released by the Indians. He spent 2010 as the hitting coach for the Lowell Spinners, Short-Season A affiliate of the Boston Red Sox and served as manager of the Rookie-level Gulf Coast Red Sox in 2011–2012. His teams compiled a 61–59 (.508) overall record, with the 2012 team winning the GCL's South Division. In December 2012, Lombard was promoted by the Red Sox to roving outfield and baserunning coordinator throughout the team's minor league farm system.

He was hired by the Braves in September 2015 to fill the same role and to serve as overall minor league field coordinator in the Atlanta player development system.

On December 17, 2015, it was announced that Lombard would be joining the Los Angeles Dodgers as first base coach, a position he held through the 2020 season. The Dodgers played in three World Series during that time, winning one of them.

On November 7, 2020, Lombard was named the bench coach for the Detroit Tigers.

Personal life
George's late mother, Posy Lombard, of Weston, Massachusetts, who died in a car accident with his grandfather at the wheel when he was 10 years old, was a noted white civil rights activist and associate of Dr. Martin Luther King Jr. The Civil Rights Movement Archive lists Posy Lombard on its In Memory page.  His maternal grandfather taught at the Harvard Business School for 41 years and was the school's former senior dean and professor of human relations.

References

External links

Sox Prospects
Pura Pelota (Venezuelan Winter League)

1975 births
Living people
African-American baseball coaches
African-American baseball players
Albuquerque Isotopes players
Atlanta Braves players
Azucareros del Este players
American expatriate baseball players in the Dominican Republic
Baseball coaches from Georgia (U.S. state)
Baseball players from Atlanta
Caribes de Oriente players
Columbus Clippers players
Major League Baseball outfielders
Detroit Tigers coaches
Detroit Tigers players
Durham Bulls players
Eugene Emeralds players
Greenville Braves players
Gulf Coast Braves players
Gulf Coast Marlins players
Gulf Coast Nationals players
Las Vegas 51s players
Long Island Ducks players
Los Angeles Dodgers coaches
Macon Braves players
Major League Baseball bench coaches
Major League Baseball first base coaches
Minor league baseball coaches
Minor league baseball managers
New Orleans Zephyrs players
Pawtucket Red Sox players
Portland Sea Dogs players
Richmond Braves players
Tampa Bay Devil Rays players
Tiburones de La Guaira players
American expatriate baseball players in Venezuela
The Lovett School alumni
Washington Nationals players
American expatriate baseball players in Australia
21st-century African-American sportspeople
20th-century African-American sportspeople